Umevu is a village in Onicha Nwe-Nkwo, Ezinihitte Local Government Area, Mbaise, Imo State, Nigeria.

Towns in Imo State